Charles Pembroke Nelson (July 2, 1907 – June 8, 1962) was an American politician and a member of the US House of Representatives from Maine.

Biography
Born in Waterville, Maine, on July 2, 1907 Nelson was the son of Nelson, John Edward and Margaret Heath Nelson. He graduated from Cony High School in Augusta, Maine and from Colby College in Waterville. Later, he attended Harvard Law School, earning his Juris Doctor.

Career
Nelson was secretary to his father, Representative John E. Nelson. The younger Nelson engaged in the general practice of law in Augusta, Maine from 1932 to 1933, then worked as city solicitor of Augusta from 1934 to 1942. He was the chief of the State Arson Division in 1941 and 1942.

Nelson entered the military service in 1942 as a second lieutenant in the United States Army Air Corps during World War II. He served in the armed forces until discharge in 1946 as a lieutenant colonel with two years of service in the European Theater of Operations. He remained a member of the National Guard and Reserves after leaving the military. He was a member of the State board of bar examiners from 1946 to 1948. He was also mayor of Augusta in 1947 and 1948.

Elected as a Republican to the Eighty-first and to the three succeeding Congresses, Nelson served from January 3, 1949 to January 3, 1957.  He retired in 1957 and became a teacher at the University of Florida for two years. He was also chief trial attorney of the State highway commission in 1959, and moderator of the town of West Bath 1960.

Death
Nelson died in Augusta, Maine on June 8, 1962 (age 54 years, 341 days). His remains were cremated, and the ashes interred on family property at Georgetown, Maine.

References

External links
 

Mayors of Augusta, Maine
University of Florida faculty
Colby College alumni
Harvard Law School alumni
Politicians from Waterville, Maine
1907 births
1962 deaths
Republican Party members of the United States House of Representatives from Maine
20th-century American politicians